Heteracanthocephalidae is a family of parasitic worms from the order Echinorhynchida.

Species
Heteracanthocephalidae  contains two subfamilies (Aspersentinae and Heteracanthocephalinae) and the following species:

Aspersentinae Golvan, 1960
Aspersentis Van Cleave, 1929
Aspersentis austrinus Van Cleave, 1929
Aspersentis dissosthychi (Parukhin, 1989)
Aspersentis johni (Bayliss, 1929)

A. johni was found parasitizing Patagonotothen longipes and Champsocephalus esox in the eastern mouth of the Beagle Channel.

Aspersentis megarhynchus (von Linstow, 1892)
Aspersentis minor Edmonds and Smales, 1992
Aspersentis peltorhamphi (Baylis, 1944)
Aspersentis zanclorhynchi (Johnston and Best, 1937)

Heteracanthocephalinae Petrochenko, 1956
Bullockrhynchus Chandra, Hanumantha-Rao & Shyamasundari, 1985
Bullockrhynchus indicus Chandra, Hanumantha-Rao & Shyamasundari, 1985
Sachalinorhynchus Krotov and Petrochenko, 1956
Sachalinorhynchus skrjabini Krotov and Petrochenko, 1956

Notes

References

Heteracanthocephalidae Petrochenko, 1956 at the World Register of Marine Species web-site

Echinorhynchida
Acanthocephala families